Mike Edmonds (born 13 January 1944) is an English actor with achondroplasia (dwarfism), known for his role as Little Ron in the children's television show Maid Marian and Her Merry Men.

Edmonds has appeared in several films, including Flash Gordon (1980), The Dark Crystal (1982), and Who Framed Roger Rabbit (1988). He played the role of Og in the Terry Gilliam film Time Bandits (1981). In Return of the Jedi, (1983) he performed as the Ewok Logray as well as the operator for Jabba the Hutt's tail.

Edmonds can be seen dancing in the Men Without Hats music video "The Safety Dance" as a dwarf jester, wearing a shirt for their Rhythm of Youth album.

With the death of Malcolm Dixon in 2020, Edmonds became the last surviving actor to have played one of the titular Time Bandits.

Filmography 
Black Jack (1979) – Tom Thumb's Army
Flash Gordon (1980) – Dwarf
The Empire Strikes Back (1980) – Ugnaught (uncredited)
Time Bandits (1981) – Og
The Dark Crystal (1982) – Aughra
I Remember Nelson (1982) - Portrait Seller
Philip Marlowe, Private Eye (1983) - Page Boy
Safety Dance (music video), Men Without Hats (1983) Jester
St Ursula's In Danger (1983) - Gypsy
Return of the Jedi (1983) – Logray (Ewok)
Cell 151 (music video), Steve Hackett (1983) - Dream Apparition
Sword of the Valiant (1984) – Tiny Man
The Master of Ballantrae (1984) - Pirate
They Came From Somewhere Else (1984) - Dwarf
Legend (1985) – Tic (uncredited)
Lost Empires (1986) - Barney
Treasures of the Mindlord (1986) - To-lor
Snow White (1987) – Biddy
Salome's Last Dance (1988) – 1st Jew
Who Framed Roger Rabbit (1988) – Stretch
The Storyteller (1988) - Tiny Tailor
Maid Marian and Her Merry Men (1989–1994) – Little Ron
The Silver Chair (1990) - Second Owl
Preacher Man (music video, Bananarama (1990) - Shaman
The 10th Kingdom (2000) - Dwarf Librarian
Fun at the Funeral Parlour (2001) - Pablo
Harry Potter and the Philosopher's Stone (2001) – Goblin (uncredited)
Starhyke (2009) - Logan
Harry Potter and the Deathly Hallows Part 2 (2011) – Goblin (uncredited)
An Accidental Studio (2019) - Self
Under the Radar: The Mike Edmonds Story (2019) - Self

References

External links 
Official website

1944 births
Living people
Actors with dwarfism
English male television actors
English male film actors
Actors from Chelmsford
People educated at The Billericay School